Lenino may refer to:

Places 
 Lenino, Saatly, Azerbaijan
 Leninkənd, Lachin, Azerbaijan
 Lenino, Mahilyow Voblast, Belarus
 Lenino, Crimea
 Karatobe, Almaty Region (formerly Lenino), Kazakhstan
 Lenino, Astrakhan Oblast, Russia
 Lenino, Amur Oblast, Russia
 Lenino, Lipetsk Oblast, Russia
 Lenino-Kokushkino, Tatarstan, Russia

Other uses 
 Lenino (air base), in Kamchatka, Russia
 Battle of Lenino, 1943